Herbert Frank Siegert (January 10, 1924 – September 26, 2008) was an American football guard and linebacker in the National Football League for the Washington Redskins.

College career
Siegert originally attended Illinois Wesleyan University, and then served in World War II as a marine in the Pacific.  After the war, he played college football at the University of Illinois and won the Big Ten Conference in 1946, as well as the 1947 Rose Bowl against the University of California, Los Angeles.  Siegert captained the 1948 team, and won All-American honors.

Professional career
Siegert was drafted in the eighteenth round of the 1949 NFL Draft by the Washington Redskins, where he played from 1949 to 1951.

Personal
After football, Siegert worked as an insurance agent. He and his wife Joan had five daughters.

See also

References

External links

American football offensive guards
United States Marine Corps personnel of World War II
Illinois Fighting Illini football players
Illinois Wesleyan University alumni
People from Pana, Illinois
Players of American football from Illinois
United States Marines
Washington Redskins players
1924 births
2008 deaths